Tiara i korona is a novel by Polish writer Teodor Jeske-Choiński, first published in 1900. Political conflict and religious views are central to the novel which explores the famous dispute between the Emperor Henry IV and Pope Gregory VII.

References

Polish historical novels
1900 novels
Political novels
19th-century Polish novels